Alexeyevka is a rural locality (a village) in Semyonkinsky Selsoviet, Aurgazinsky District, Bashkortostan, Russia. The population was 16 as of 2010. There is 1 street.

Geography 
It is located 27 km from Tolbazy.

References 

Rural localities in Aurgazinsky District